Qırmızıkənd (also, Kyrmyzykend) is a village and municipality in the Neftchala Rayon of Azerbaijan.  It has a population of 2,329.

References 

Populated places in Neftchala District